Cnemaspis tanintharyi, the Tanintharyi rock gecko, is a species of diurnal, rock-dwelling, insectivorous gecko endemic to  Myanmar. It is distributed in the Tanintharyi Region.

References

 Cnemaspis tanintharyi

tanintharyi
Reptiles of Myanmar
Reptiles described in 2019